Zenaspis is an extinct genus of jawless fish which existed during the early Devonian period. Due to it being jawless, Zenaspis was probably a bottom feeder. The fish was around 10 inches (25 cm) in length. It had a horseshoe shaped head that probably sheltered a small brain.

References

Osteostraci genera
Devonian jawless fish
Early Devonian fish of Europe